Nauru-United States relations are the bilateral relations of Nauru and the United States

The Nauruan government has a very complex relationship with the United States; the government of Bernard Dowiyogo agreed to stop passport sales and offshore banking in return for an extensive aid package. However, that aid has not been delivered and Nauru's formal and traditional leaders are now looking to Japan and China for assistance. According to the U.S. Department of State, Nauru has cordial relations with the United States

The U.S. has no consular or diplomatic offices in Nauru. Officers of the American Embassy in Suva, Fiji, are concurrently accredited to Nauru and make periodic visits.

In September 2007, David Adeang, Nauru's Foreign Minister, visited Cuba. On this occasion, he made a number of public statements in relation to the United States. He extolled Cuba and criticized US foreign policy, during a visit to the Caribbean island. Subsequently, the United States Department of State, referring to events investigated in 2007, reported criticism of Adeang in its Human Rights Report, issued for 2008. This criticism was included in the State Department's report, despite the fact that police, having undertaken an investigation of allegations of wrongdoing, made no attempt to prosecute Adeang. Shortly after Adeang's public pronouncements, a crisis, with himself at the centre, led to the collapse of President of Nauru Ludwig Scotty's government.

Trade between the United States and Nauru is limited by the latter's small size and economic problems. The value of two-way trade in 2005 was US$1.6 million.

In October 2008 the new US Ambassador to Fiji, also accredited to Nauru, pledged efforts to assist Nauru's economic development.

On December 3, 2020, the US Ambassador Joseph Cella hosted Nauruan High Commissioner Michael Aroi at the US Embassy in Suva where they signed a Nauru-United States Investment Incentive Agreement. The agreement will establish a framework through which a full range of investment support offered by the U.S. International Development Finance Corporation (DFC).

References

 
United States
Bilateral relations of the United States